Raphanorhyncha is a genus of flowering plants belonging to the family Brassicaceae.

Its native range is Northeastern Mexico.

Species:
 Raphanorhyncha crassa Rollins

References

Brassicaceae
Brassicaceae genera